Kehinde Wiley (born February 28, 1977) is an American portrait painter based in New York City, who is known for his highly naturalistic paintings of Black people, frequently referencing the work of Old Master paintings. He was commissioned in 2017 to paint a portrait of former President Barack Obama for the Smithsonian National Portrait Gallery, which has portraits of all previous American presidents. The Columbus Museum of Art, which hosted an exhibition of his work in 2007, describes his work as follows: "Wiley has gained recent acclaim for his heroic portraits which address the image and status of young African-American men in contemporary culture."

Wiley was included in Time magazine's 100 Most Influential People of 2018.

Early life and education 
Wiley was born in Los Angeles, California. His father, Isaiah D. Obot, is Ibibio, from Nigeria, and his mother, Freddie Mae Wiley, is African-American. Wiley has a twin brother. When Wiley was a child, his mother wanted him and his brother to stay out of the streets and so she supported their interest in art and enrolled them in after-school art classes. At the age of 11, Wiley and his brother were selected with 48 other kids to spend a short time at a conservatory of art in Russia, just outside St. Petersburg. It was here that Wiley developed his passion for portraiture. Wiley noted that his brother was better at portraiture than he was and this created a competitive sense between them. The siblings would compete to see who could recreate the most realistic images. He continued with other classes in the US and attended high school at the Los Angeles County High School for the Arts.

The twins were raised by their mother; once their father, who had come to the US as a scholarship student, finished his studies,[12] he returned to Nigeria, leaving Freddie to raise the couple's six children.[13] Wiley has said that his family survived on welfare checks and the limited income earned by his mother's "thrift store" – which consisted of a patch of sidewalk outside their home.[14] Wiley traveled to Nigeria at the age of 20 to meet his father and explore his family roots there.[15] He was strongly influenced by seeing the works of Gainsborough and Constable. He earned his BFA from the San Francisco Art Institute in 1999 and then received a scholarship to complete his MFA at Yale University School of Art in 2001. While at art school, he says that the most important lesson he learned was to create art that he wanted to make, not art that his professors wanted him to make. [1] Before becoming an artist-in-residence at the Studio Museum in Harlem,[16] which Wiley has later stated: "made [him] the artist [he] is today."[17]Jeffrey Deitch, an art dealer, and curator, gave Wiley his first solo show – Passing/Posing – at the Hoffman Gallery in Chicago in 2005. Deitch represented him for the next 10 years.[18]

Wiley has cited the artist Kerry James Marshall as being a big influence on him.

Career

Residency and inspiration 
The beginnings of Wiley's now-famous portraits can be traced back to his time in Harlem, New York, during his residency at the Studio Museum. It was at this time he came upon a crumpled mugshot released by the New York Police Department. On it was a photo of an African American man in his twenties with his basic personal information in order for the man to be identified. Wiley held onto this mugshot that would inspire some of his future work, such as Conspicuous Fraud Series #1 (Eminence), as well as a recreation of this mugshot in Mugshot Study (2006, Plate 8). When later commenting on his fascination with the mugshot and its influence in his art, Wiley noted that when he found it on the street, it altered his view of what portraiture could be as well as solidified his feelings about the portrayal of black men in the world. Wiley saw that there was something lacking. He then turned to his background in classical paintings and began to compare this new type of portraiture to the ones he studied from the eighteenth century. This would spark inspiration in Wiley and lead to him creating a combination of his new modern portraiture and the classic ones from history.

The world stage 
Although Wiley's portraits were initially based on photographs of young men from the streets of Harlem, Wiley began to expand to an international view, including models found in urban backdrops from around the world – including Mumbai, Senegal, Dakar and Rio de Janeiro. This immense body of work became known as, "The World Stage." Models are dressed in their everyday clothing and asked to assume poses found in artwork from their location's history. It's a juxtaposition of "the 'old' inherited by the 'new' – who often have no visual inheritance of which to speak." Wiley says this instantly sparks a conversation that is equally emotional as it is intellectual.

Wiley chooses countries that he believes are on the "conversation block" in the 21st century to be a part of The World Stage. Wiley chose Brazil, Nigeria, India, and China because they are all "points of anxiety and curiosity and production" to the world. As Wiley has traveled around the world, he has noticed that many people around the world interact with the American culture and the Black American expression. As he continues to paint models from streets around the world, he is increasingly painting them not based on Western painting anymore, but art from these countries that have a wealth of history.

Barack Obama presidential portrait

In October 2017, it was announced that Wiley had been chosen by Barack Obama to paint an official portrait of the former president to appear in Smithsonian National Portrait Gallery "America's Presidents" exhibition along with Amy Sherald who was chosen by Michelle Obama for the First Lady portrait on the same day. They were the first Black artists to paint an American President's portrait and a First Lady's portrait, respectively. The portrait took him over two years from the first conversation about the commission to the unveiling which took place on February 12, 2018, at the Smithsonian National Portrait Gallery, where past president portraits have been displayed outside the White House. Compared to past presidential portraits, which show their subjects in a more realistic representation of an office as a background to show their authority, Wiley depicted Obama seated casually on an antique chair, seemingly floating among the foliage. Each flower points to a location which represents an event that happened in Obama's life, such as the chrysanthemum, the official flower of the city of Chicago (where he was elected as senator), African lilies, representing Kenya to show respect to Obama's father, who died when he was a child, and jasmine, representing Obama's childhood in Hawaii with his grandparents. The inspiration for Obama's pose came from the photography session to get photographs of Obama to use for the portrait. Wiley recalled a moment of repose in between shots when Obama was essentially as he is depicted in the portrait, a pose the artist felt was authentic to Obama. During the unveiling of Obama's portrait, Wiley stated in an interview that Obama wanted "a very relaxed, man-of-the-people representation" and Wiley created that image through small details: an open collar, the absence of a tie, and the perception that the President's body was physically moving towards the viewer instead of appearing aloof. Wiley mentioned that Obama and the foreground of the plants are having a battle of, "Who gets to be the star of the show, the story or the man who inhabits that story?", which Wiley wants to show that Obama is the one who claims the spotlight of the portrait and not just his story and experiences that helped contour his life. President Obama saw in Wiley's work that he is able to elevate an ordinary person to look like a royalty and to lift then up so that they belong as a part of American life, since Obama believed that politics should be about the country unfolding from the bottom up and not the other way around. Wiley also mentioned in the unveiling of Obama's portrait that he went to museums in Los Angeles and noticed that there weren't many artworks that display African Americans and he wanted to change that. He hoped that one day the artworks that he creates can inspire future African American generations who look up at the museum wall and see someone who looks like them being displayed at the museum, especially the portrait of the first Black American president. After the unveiling of Wiley's portrait of the President and Amy Sherald's portrait of the First Lady, the Smithsonian National museum saw an increase in the number of visitors from 1.1 to 2.1 million people.

Some conservative commentators criticized the selection of Wiley for the commission because he had earlier produced two painting variations of Judith Beheading Holofernes, in which he depicts African-American women holding the severed heads of white women.

Rumors of War series and statue 
Wiley's initial series of works titled Rumors of War were commissioned in 2005 and depicted contemporary men, as opposed to the 'heroic' equestrians in the originals, wearing sports team jerseys and Timberland boots, with Wiley deciding to keep the original titles.

Wiley revisited this idea after visiting Richmond, Virginia, where he became interested in the Confederate monuments on Monument Avenue and the idea of the Lost Cause of the Confederacy existing within a modern "hipster" town. In response to the monuments, Wiley decided to create Rumors of War, a thirty foot tall statue of a young, black man sporting jeans, Nike high-tops and dreadlocks, modeled on Monument Avenue's statue of J. E. B. Stuart. Rumors of War was unveiled in Times Square before being moved to the Virginia Museum of Fine Arts, a mile away from the J. E. B. Stuart statue which inspired it and the institute that commissioned it. At 27 feet high and 16 feet wide, it is his largest work to date, as of 2019. Rumors of War was delivered in collaboration with Times Square Arts, Sean Kelly Gallery and UAP.

Other work
Wiley had a retrospective in 2016 at the Seattle Art Museum. In May 2017, he had an exhibit, Trickster, at the Sean Kelly Gallery, New York City. The exhibit featured 11 paintings depicting contemporary black artists.
Wiley opened a studio in Beijing, China, in 2006 to use several helpers to do brushstrokes for his paintings. Initially, outsourcing work to China had been done to cut costs but by 2012, Wiley told New York magazine that low costs was no longer the reason. Critics have long wondered about the extent to which Wiley's paintings are painted by Wiley himself. When asked if one could visit his studio in China to watch him paint, the artist declined. Wiley's Beijing studio is managed by Ain Cocke, who has worked for him for close to a decade, first as a painting assistant and now as a manager. He is an accomplished painter, though far less successful commercially.

In 2021, Wiley's work Go became a permanent for Penn Station's concourse in New York City. The stained-glass work depicts black break-dancers on a background of the sky with clouds. The piece is inspired by the 18th century ceiling frescoes of Giovanni Battista Tiepolo. The work is his first permanent, site-specific installation in the medium of glass.

Imagery, symbolism, and themes

Reimagining the Old Masters with Black protagonists 
Wiley often references Old Masters paintings for the pose of a figure. Wiley's paintings often blur the boundaries between traditional and contemporary modes of representation. Rendering his figures in a realistic mode—while making references to specific Old Master paintings—Wiley creates a fusion of period styles and influences, ranging from French Rococo, Islamic architecture, and West African textile design, to urban hip hop and the "Sea Foam Green" of a Martha Stewart Interiors color swatch. Wiley depicts his slightly larger than life-size figures in a heroic manner, giving them poses that connote power and spiritual awakening. Wiley's portrayal of masculinity is filtered through these poses of power and spirituality.

In a number of his paintings, Wiley inserts black protagonists into Old Master paintings. In 2007 he reimagined Théodore Géricault's early-nineteenth-century The Charging Chasseur with a young black man in casual streetwear as the sword-wielding hussar in his painting Officer of the Hussars.

Similarly, his Napoleon Leading the Army over the Alps (2005) is based on Napoleon Crossing the Alps (1800) by Jacques-Louis David, often regarded as a "masterpiece." Wiley restaged it with an African rider wearing modern army fatigues and a bandanna. Wiley "investigates the perception of blackness and creates a contemporary hybrid Olympus in which tradition is invested with a new street credibility". While creating the work Wiley attempted to use real horses to model and found that the proportions between man and horse in the original work to be unrealistic. The purpose of art during David's time was to serve as propaganda. Although seemingly naturalistic, both Wiley's and David's portraits feature rider's who are disproportionate to their steed, because "men look a lot smaller on real horses." Wiley claims to be simultaneously drawn to the illusion used in Old Masters paintings while also wanting to expose them: "The appeal, I suppose, is that, in a world so unmasterable and so unknowable, you give the illusion or veneer of the rational, of order—these strong men, these powerful purveyors of truth. And so this thing that I do is in a strange sense being drawn toward that flame and wanting to blow it out at once."

His portraits are based on photographs of young men whom Wiley sees on the street. He has painted men from Harlem's 125th Street, as well as the South Central Los Angeles neighborhood where he was born. Dressed in street clothes, his models were asked to assume poses from the paintings of Renaissance masters, such as Titian and Giovanni Battista Tiepolo. Wiley describes his approach as "interrogating the notion of the master painter, at once critical and complicit". His figurative paintings "quote historical sources and position young black men within that field of power". In this manner, his paintings fuse history and style in a unique and contemporary manner. His art has been described as having homoerotic qualities. Wiley has used a sperm motif as symbolic of masculinity and gender.

This reimagining was also seen in Wiley's VH1 commissioned piece, where he was asked to paint honorees for the 2005 Hip Hop Honours program. Wiley depicted the rapper Ice T as Napoleon and Grandmaster Flash and the Furious Five as a Dutch Civic guard company from the 17th century.

Sometimes Wiley changes the gender of figures portrayed in the older works. In Portrait of a Couple from 2012, he replaces the couple (man and woman) depicted in the original painting from 1610 with a pair of young men. The same year, he exhibited two variations on the Judith Beheading Holofernes Biblical story famously painted by Caravaggio, replacing the male Holofernes with female figures. New York magazine described one of these as depicting "a tall, elegant black woman in a long blue dress. In one hand, she holds a knife. In the other, a cleanly severed brunette female head". Wiley said about this work: "It's sort of a play on the 'kill whitey' thing". A second painting entitled Judith Beheading Holofernes also features a modern-day black woman as Judith and a white woman as Holofernes, challenging the viewer's expectations of this familiar motif, inviting political readings, and "bending a violent image from art history—which is rife with them [...]—to the needs of a country that is reexamining the violent underpinnings of even its most benign-seeming traditions." Art critic Walter Robinson remarks that this reimagining of the Judith/Holofernes story "suggests, with a jovial brutality, that Judith would prefer to be done with white standards of beauty."

Masculinity and femininity 
Much of Wiley's work focuses on male figures. This is an intentional choice by Wiley to reflect on the lack of female figures in art history in portraits due to societal norms. The way in which Wiley positions his figures and how he paints them switches the feminine and masculine roles. He emphasizes features of his Black figures that eroticizes them in a way women were traditionally portrayed. He focuses on their bodies, includes motifs like sperm that reference their vitality, and poses them in vulnerable positions. The floral and decorative backgrounds put into question the idea of masculinity. The patterns of lace and flowers are often associated with femininity and by submerging his male figures in these ornate backgrounds, Wiley acknowledges the beauty and youth of his subjects.

Power 
Wiley's intent when he began to create these ornate portraits was to re-image Black men's depiction in art. The way he has his models pose, in similar positions and stances as the original figures in classical paintings, is meant to act as commentary for the historical power dynamic of African American men and white men. In the recreation of these 18th century portraits, modern black men that he meets on the streets are taking the place of the original subjects, they are assuming their position or power. He paints them as people who are worthy of being noticed, rather than background elements or in subservient positions. Wiley is also creating a portrayal of African American men that is not often seen in the media today. Wiley challenges a perception that has been continually pushed onto society. Rather than depict them as angry or tough, he creates portraits where the figures are dignified, confident, and at times vulnerable. The figures are in poses in ways that do not always align with what is considered masculine for black men today.

Background imagery 
Wiley’s portrait paintings are known for their bright and colorful backgrounds. These intricate backgrounds are purposefully different from the portraits they are based on. The original backdrops of the classical portraits Wiley uses for his references are full of sweeping estates, their families, and other possessions. Wiley instead creates detailed backgrounds full of bright patterns that at times enter the foreground in front of the figures. His intent is to create a background that just like his figures is competing to be noticed and blend the two in order to elevate the figures. The background imagery is meant to add a layered complexity to the work.

Wiley draws inspiration for these designs from historical work from the Rococo and Neoclassical art period as well as elaborate wallpapers. The original portraits that Wiley recreates would have hung in lavish homes of the wealthy amongst other extremely detailed ornaments to further enhance the wealth of the homeowners. By replicating these patterns and motifs from opulent decor and other elements of interior design and encapsulating his figures within them, Wiley is recreating a similar sense of wealth with his portraits. Viewers are led to re-contextualize their view of the urban figures as they associate them with the lavish backdrops.

Recognition and honors 
In October 2011, Wiley received the artist of the Year Award from the New York City Art Teachers Association/United Federation of Teachers. He also received Canteen Magazine. Two of Wiley's paintings were featured on the top of 500 New York City taxi cabs in early 2011 as a collaboration with the Art Production Fund.

Wiley is featured in a commercial on the USA as a 2010 Character Honoree.

Puma AG commissioned Wiley to paint four portraits of prominent African soccer players. Patterns from his paintings were incorporated into Puma athletic gear. The complete series, Legends of Unity: World Cup 2010, was exhibited in early 2010 at Deitch Projects in New York City.

His work was exhibited in the National Portrait Gallery as part of the Recognize exhibit in 2008. Kehinde Wiley: A New Republic, was a retrospective at the Virginia Museum of Fine Arts (Richmond, VA), in the summer of 2016 (June 11 – September 5). It displayed nearly 60 of his paintings and sculptures.

Personal life 

Wiley has kept his personal life private but acknowledges that he identifies as a gay man. In reference to his sexuality Wiley has said "my sexuality is not black and white. I am a gay man who has drifted. I am not bi. I've had perfectly pleasant romances with women, but they weren't sustainable. My passion wasn't there. I would always be looking at guys."

Between 2014 and 2018, he created Black Rock Senegal in Yoff, an artist residence designed by Senegalese architect Abib Djenne.

List of works

Solo exhibitions 
 2002 Kehinde Wiley at Real Art Ways, Hartford, CT 
 2002 Passing/Posing at the Rhona Hoffman Gallery, Chicago, IL
2003 Pictures at an Exhibition at Roberts & Tilton, Los Angeles, CA
2003 Faux/Real at Deitch Projects, New York, NY
2004 Easter Realness at Rhona Hoffman Gallery, Chicago, IL
2004 Passing/Posing The Paintings of Kehinde Wiley at The Brooklyn Museum of Art, Brooklyn, NY, catalogue
2005 Bound - Kehinde Wiley Paintings at Franklin Art Works, Minneapolis, MN
2005 White at the Conner Contemporary, Washington, D.C.
2005 Rumors of War at Deitch Projects, New York, NY
2006: Kehinde Wiley: Columbus at the Columbus Museum of Art, Columbus, OH
 2006: Willem van Heythuysen at the Virginia Museum of Fine Arts, Richmond, VA
 2007: Kehinde Wiley: The World Stage—China at the John Michael Kohler Arts Center, Sheboygan, WI
 2008: Three Wise Men Greeting Entry Into Lagos at (PAFA) Pennsylvania Academy Of Fine Arts, Philadelphia, PA
 2009: The World Stage: Africa at ArtSpace, San Antonio, TX
 2009: Black Light at Deitch Projects, New York City
 2010: Legends of Unity | World Cup 2010 | PUMA, several locations worldwide
 2011: Kehinde Wiley: Selected Works at the Savannah College of Art and Design (SCAD) Museum of Art, Savannah, GA
 2012: Kehinde Wiley/ The World Stage: Israel at The Jewish Museum, New York City
 2011–13: The World Stage: Israel at Roberts & Tilton, Culver City, CA; traveled to Jewish Museum (New York) (2012); the Contemporary Jewish Museum, San Francisco, CA (2013); Boise Art Museum, Boise, ID (2013)
 2013: Kehinde Wiley: Memling at Phoenix Art Museum, Phoenix, AZ
 2015–17: Kehinde Wiley: A New Republic at the Brooklyn Museum (2015), Brooklyn, NY; traveled to Modern Art Museum of Fort Worth, Fort Worth, TX (2016); Virginia Museum of Fine Arts, Richmond, VA (2016); Seattle Art Museum, Seattle, WA (2016); Phoenix Art Museum, Phoenix, AZ (2016); Toledo Museum of Art, Toledo, OH (2017), Oklahoma City Museum of Art (2017)
 2018 October 19 - February 10, 2019: Kehinde Wiley at St. Louis Museum of Art, St. Louis, MO.

Collections

 Brooklyn Museum in Brooklyn, New York
 Columbus Museum of Art in Columbus, Ohio
 Crocker Art Museum in Sacramento, California
 Detroit Institute of Arts (DIA) in Detroit, Michigan
 Gibbes Museum of Art in Charleston, SC 
 Hammer Museum, in Los Angeles, California
 Harn Museum of Art in Gainesville, Florida
 Harvard Art Museums Fogg Museum in Cambridge, Massachusetts 
 High Museum of Art in Atlanta, Georgia
 Jewish Museum in New York City, New York
 Los Angeles County Museum of Art in Los Angeles, California
 Milwaukee Art Museum in Milwaukee, Wisconsin
 Minneapolis Institute of Art in Minneapolis, Minnesota
 Mint Museum in Charlotte, North Carolina
 Musee des Beaux Arts de Montreal (The Montreal Museum of Fine Arts) in Montreal, Canada
 Museum of Fine Arts in Boston, Massachusetts
 Museum of Fine Arts in St. Petersburg, Florida 
 Nasher Museum of Art in Durham, North Carolina
 National Portrait Gallery in Washington, D.C.
 Nelson-Atkins Museum of Art in Kansas City, Missouri
 Nerman Museum of Contemporary Art in Overland Park, Kansas
 North Carolina Museum of Art in Raleigh, North Carolina
 Oak Park Public Library in Oak Park, Illinois
 Philbrook Museum of Art in Tulsa, Oklahoma
 Phoenix Art Museum in Phoenix, Arizona
 Portland Art Museum in Portland, Oregon
 Saint Louis Art Museum in St. Louis, Missouri
 San Antonio Museum of Art in San Antonio, Texas
 Seattle Art Museum in Seattle, Washington
 Studio Museum in Harlem in New York City, New York
 Toledo Museum of Art in Toledo, Ohio
 Virginia Museum of Fine Arts in Richmond, Virginia
 Wadsworth Atheneum in Hartford, Connecticut
 Walker Art Center in Minneapolis, Minnesota

References

External links

 
Kehinde Wiley at Roberts Projects, Los Angeles, CA
Three Wise Men Greeting Entry into Lagos at PAFA
Kehinde Wiley at ArtNet
Kehinde Wiley at Sean Kelly Gallery
Artist Towel Series 2008
Kehinde Wiley at Minneapolis Institute of Art

1977 births
20th-century African-American painters
20th-century American male artists
20th-century American painters
21st-century African-American artists
21st-century American painters
African-American contemporary artists
American contemporary artists
American contemporary painters
American male painters
American people of Yoruba descent
American portrait painters
American twins
American gay artists
LGBT African Americans
Living people
Los Angeles County High School for the Arts alumni
Painters from New York (state)
San Francisco Art Institute alumni
Yale School of Art alumni
Yoruba artists